WQRS (98.3 FM) is a radio station in Salamanca, New York in the Olean, New York broadcasting area. The station broadcasts a classic rock format, with its license owned by Seven Mountains Media, the dominant commercial broadcaster in Cattaraugus County. The station's transmitter is based in Carrollton.

History
The station signed on October 15, 1988 It signed on as WQRT, and its slogan was "Great 98 Country."  Although it was part of the boom in rural and suburban FM stations that gave country music a major boost in the late 1980s, WQRT followed an approach more akin to the older country outlets of the time, with a mix of modern and traditional classic country.  They served the Salamanca, Bradford, and Olean markets. WQRT was the top rated station since there were not many country stations.  One year after WQRT's sign-on, 95.7 in Olean switched from its old adult-contemporary/easy listening format to country and became WPIG; WPIG, in contrast to WQRT's classic approach, followed the more modern approach of most of the newer country stations and focused on the "hot country" style emerging at the time, allowing WQRT to maintain its niche for several more years.  During this era, WQRT was owned by Gary Livingston.

Beginning in the late 1990s, the station rebranded as 98 Rocks, under the ownership of Michael Washington until the year 2006, when Washington sold the station to Pembrook Pines Media Group.

WQRS primarily broadcast programming from Dial Global's "Classic Rock" (and before that, The Classic Rock Experience from ABC) and also carried the syndicated Nights with Alice Cooper program.

In September 2010, WQRS quietly ended its classic rock format and switched to an all-satellite country music format, simulcasting WZKZ in Alfred.

On October 2, 2013 WQRS changed their format back to classic rock and returned to the "98 Rocks" brand. The current format is locally originated (but automated) and features a broader, album-oriented playlist. In late September 2014, Sound Communication became the owner of WQRS. WQRS, along with the other Sound Communications stations, was sold to Seven Mountains Media in 2021.

On November 29, 2021 WQRS rebranded as "The G.O.A.T." and added a simulcast on sister station WOEN 1360 AM. Its airstaff consists of syndicated programming and jockeys from other Seven Mountains stations in Olean.

The WQRS call sign was previously heard on a classical music FM station in Detroit, Michigan.

Previous logo

References

External links

Waypoint Media
QRS
Classic rock radio stations in the United States